Murdaa Ghar (House of Corpses) is a Hindi horror movie of Bollywood directed by Kishan Shah and produced by Shakuntala Gohil. This film was released on 16 July 1999 under the banner of Mangla films.

Plot

Cast
 Shakti Kapoor
 Neelam Kothari
 Jyoti Rana
 Anuradha Sawant
 Vinod Tripathi
 Anil Nagrath
 Satyen Kaul
 Raj Premi

References

External links
 

1999 films
1990s Hindi-language films
Indian horror films
Hindi-language horror films
1999 horror films